The Jesters were a white soul/R&B  band in Athens, Georgia, United States, formed in 1964. They lasted 50 years. Among the acts they either toured with or opened for were Jerry Butler, Marvin Gaye, Patti LaBelle, The Marvellettes, The Platters and Jackie Wilson.

Background

1964 - 1970
Along with Zodiacs and the Blue Blenders, they were one of the pop bands in the Athens area.

Members

 Davis Causey, guitar, 1964
 Artie Christopher, vocals, 1965-1968,
 Steve Hartley - Lead vocals, 1967-1969, 1981 - 2000s
 Mike Haynes, keyboards, 1994 
 Cleon Little, bass, 1968 - 2004
 Bill McDonald, sax, 1964
 Scotty Piotrowski, trumpet, 1964

 Tom Ryan, bass, 2004 - 2000s
 Freddy Seagraves, drums, 1964
 Donny Whitehead, sax, 1966
 Harold Williams, sax 1964
 Billy Young, trumpet, 1964
 Clarence Young, organ, 1982 - 1995

List of past members

 David Aaron, guitar - 1968 - 1969
 Don Allgood, organ - 1965 - 1966
 Monty Black, bass - 1968
 Freddie Brown, keyboards - 1965
 Davis Causey, guitar - 1964 - 1968, 1981 - 2000s
 Artie Christopher, vocals - 1965 - 1968
 Larry Coffeen, saxophone - 1964 - 1965 
 Mike Haynes, keyboards - 1991 - 2000s
 Steve Hartley, vocals - 1967-1969, 1981 - 2000s
 Lawrence Hill, trumpet, vocals - 1968 - 1969
 Bill MacDonald, saxophone - 1964-1969, 1981 - 2000s
 Cleon Nally, bass - 1965-1979, 1981 - 2000s
 Joel Osner - 1964 - 1968

 Scott Piotrowski, trumpet - 1965-1968, 1981 - 2000s
 Bobby Prince - 1964 - 1966
 David Prince, 1964 - 1966
 Tom Ryan, bass - 2004 - 2000s
 Ed Saye, vocal - 1964 - 1966
 Freddy Seagraves, drums - 1964 - 1969, 1981 to 2000s
 Donny Whitehead, saxophone - 1964-1969, 1981 - 2000s
 Harold Williams, 1964 - 1968, 1981 - 2000s
 Billy Young, trumpet - 1965-1969, 1981 - 2000s
 Clarence Young, keyboards - 1982 - 1995
 Diana Young, vocals - 1965

Discography
 Sure Thing - SKU: 1933 - (2010)

References

External links
 The Jesters "Higher and Higher" A concert for Harold Williams @ GA TH
 Band photos
 Athens, Georgia Band Directories, Jesters
 Southern Garage Bands - The Jesters

Musical groups from Athens, Georgia
Musical groups from Georgia (U.S. state)
American rhythm and blues musical groups
American soul musical groups
Musical groups established in 1964
Musical groups disestablished in 1970
Musical groups reestablished in 1982
Musical groups disestablished in 2014